Water rides are amusement rides that are set over water. For instance, a log flume travels through a channel of water to move along its course.

Notable types

AquaLoop
Bumper boats
Fishpipe
FlowRider
Lazy river
Log flume
Old Mill
River caves
River rapids ride
Shoot the Chute
Tornado
Tow boat ride
Water coaster
Water slide

Notable examples
Journey to Atlantis
Jurassic Park: The Ride
Pirates of the Caribbean
Thunder River
Timber Mountain Log Ride
Splash Mountain